Donald Stanley Haldeman (May 29, 1947 – February 22, 2003) was an American sport shooter from Souderton, Pennsylvania. He competed and won a gold medal in the 1976 Summer Olympics, the third American shooter to win Olympic gold in Trapshooting. He served in the United States Army during the Vietnam War era.

References

1947 births
2003 deaths
American male sport shooters
United States Distinguished Marksman
Trap and double trap shooters
Shooters at the 1972 Summer Olympics
Shooters at the 1976 Summer Olympics
Olympic gold medalists for the United States in shooting
Olympic medalists in shooting
Medalists at the 1976 Summer Olympics
People from Souderton, Pennsylvania
Pan American Games medalists in shooting
Pan American Games gold medalists for the United States
Pan American Games silver medalists for the United States
Shooters at the 1975 Pan American Games
United States Army soldiers
20th-century American people
21st-century American people